The Cheboygan Crib Light is a light that marks the west pier head of the mouth of the Cheboygan River into Lake Huron. The pier head, in the center of the municipality of Cheboygan, is located at the north or lake end of Huron Street, and is one of the centerpieces of Cheboygan's Gordon Turner Park.

History

1884-1920: manned light
The Crib Light is called a "light" rather than a "lighthouse" because it does not contain a structure in which a keeper lived. It is assumed that the keeper lived in Cheboygan; this would have required him to boat daily to the crib, despite weather conditions, to maintain the kerosene-fired light. This was hazardous duty, and in due course davits were installed on the Crib Light; this enabled a boat making dock at the crib to be raised, more easily unloaded, and be protected from the waves.

In 1901 this station was painted white to increase its visibility as a daymark. Two years later, in 1903, the existing wooden structure was torn down to a depth of  into the water and a new sturdier concrete steel structure was erected. Iron railings were also installed to aid with safety.

In 1906, the rebuilt light was severely damaged when a schooner hit it.  A fog bell was then installed to help prevent such collisions and the railing was replaced. In 1911 an automated fog bell was installed, sounding a characteristic single stroke every ten seconds.

1920-present: automated light
In 1920, the Lighthouse Service oversaw the automation of the Crib Light. In the Crib Light's new incarnation, kerosene was no longer necessary; instead, a traveling crew periodically delivered tanks of the flammable gas acetylene. A reliable pilot light burned day and night. When the sun set, the resulting drop in temperature would open a precision valve and release a flow of acetylene against the pilot light, causing the light to shine.

When last Lighthouse keeper left in 1929, it quickly degraded.  "The light earned the nickname 'The Dummy'” from the locals."

In the second half of the 20th century, the invention of radar and other electronic aids to navigation began to render many Great Lakes navigational light towers redundant. The Crib Light was considered by the Coast Guard to be "surplus" property. In 1984, the Crib Light tower was removed from its crib and placed on its current base located on the Gordon Turner Park pier head.

As noted by a Coast Guard researcher:
The light earned the nickname “The Dummy” from the locals. When locals learned of the Coast Guard’s plans to demolish the site, an agreement was made to donate the light to the city of Cheboygan. The light was moved to the West Breakwall in the Gordon Turner Park. Restoration work has been done on the tower. The grounds are open to the public.

The Cheboygan Crib Light is now maintained by the municipality of Cheboygan; the light itself, which is now powered by electricity, is maintained by a local support group.  The light tower is considered by many to be a symbol of Cheboygan. In 2003, the municipality succeeded in clearing its title to the light and erasing its status as "surplus" property nominally under the ownership of the federal General Services Administration.

Location
The light is in Gordon Turner Park, which is located north of U.S. Highway 23 in Cheboygan, just west of the Cheboygan River. The park's boardwalk leads to the Cheboygan River and the light. The light may also been viewed from eastbound lighthouse cruises offered by Shepler's Ferry out of Mackinaw City.

It is not lighted at this time.  Visitors to Gordon Turner Park can view and walk around the light at the end of Water Street in Cheboygan. A few blocks upriver is the Cheboygan River Front Range Light.

References

External links

 Barnes, Skip, recent photo of Cheboygan Crib Light.
 Detroit News, Interactive map on Michigan lighthouses.
 The Great Lakes Lighthouse Keepers Association.
 Interactive map of Lighthouses in the area.
 Interactive map, list, information for lighthouses in North and West Lake Huron.
 Map of Michigan Lighthouses.
 Terry Pepper, Seeing the Light, Cheboygan Crib Light.

Lighthouses completed in 1884
Lighthouses in Michigan
Buildings and structures in Cheboygan County, Michigan
Tourist attractions in Cheboygan County, Michigan